Daichi Kamino is a Japanese long-distance runner. In 2019, he won the Asian Marathon Championships held in Dongguan, China.

He also competed at the 2018 Tokyo Marathon and 2019 Tokyo Marathon.

References

External links 
 

Living people
Year of birth missing (living people)
Place of birth missing (living people)
Japanese male long-distance runners
Japanese male marathon runners